Atru is a town in the Baran district in Rajasthan, India. It is located in the southeast of northern Indian state of Rajasthan. It is tehsil of Baran.  It is located around 30 kilometres south of the Baran district. Atru tehsil is the biggest tehsil of the Baran district, and has 141 villages under its administration. There are many facilities like a railway station, a hospital, schools, markets, well equipped rods for traffic.
The most famous festival is Dhanush lila on the occasion there is a fair is organized for 3 days.

History 

A 1257 CE inscription of the Paramara king Jayavarman II was found on the pillar of the Gadgach temple in Atru. The 6-line inscription records the grant of a village to a poet. It is possible that Jayavarman extended the Paramara territories in present-day Rajasthan, resulting in his conflict with the Chahamana rulers of Ranthambore.

Politics 

The Member of Parliament from Atru is Dushyant Singh, who is a member of BJP and also the son of ex-Rajasthan chief minister Vasundhara Raje. The MLA (Member of Legislative Assembly) is Panachand Meghwal who belongs to Congress Party. The Pradhan of Atru Panchayat Samiti is Smt.Vandana Nagar elected form ward no.12 Gram Panchayat Patna- Hathi dilod

Climate

The town has a dry climate except during monsoon. The summer runs from March to mid of June, as in most parts of the country. The period from mid of June to September is the monsoon season followed by the months October to mid of November constitute the post monsoon or the retreating monsoon. January is generally the coldest month with an average daily maximum temperature of 24.3 °C and the average daily minimum temperature of 10.6 °C. Usually, the town has a dry climate but in monsoons, the weather becomes humid. The months from November to February constitute winter. The average rainfall experienced by the town is around 895.2 mm.

Culture
Dhanushlila performance before Diwali attracts many people. People celebrate Eid, Holi, Diwali, Dol Mela, Jagannath Yatra, Ramjaan and Makar Sakranti.

Sculpture
One of Sculpture "Mithuna of Gargach" has been stolen from the temple.

Archaeology
Atru is the centre of many Archaeological sites. ASI has covered all sites with the boundary wall and fence. 
The most fascinating sites are Gargach Temple and Gautam Buddha Park. History of Gargach Temple goes back to the 10th century.

Transport 

Atru is well connected with road and rail to all major cities within Rajasthan as well as those located outside the state.

Road 
Atru is connected with all cities of Rajasthan state through well-equipped roads. National Highway No.90 (connecting now National Highway No. 27and NH

12) passes through the town. National Highway No.90 (now National Highway No. 27) is a part of East-West Corridor.

Railway Station 
Atru railway station is situated on Kota-Bina section of Western Central Railways. Its code is ATRU. It serves Atru town. The station consists of 2 platforms. Passenger, Express, and Superfast trains halt here. It is about 100 km from Kota Junction.

Airport 
The nearest major airports are located at Kota Airport, Jaipur International Airport, Udaipur Airport, and Jodhpur Airport. These airports connect Rajasthan with the major cities of India such as Delhi and Mumbai. The nearest airport is Kota. Although small airplanes can only fly there. We can go from Kota Airport to Jaipur and Delhi only.

Tourism 
Shergarh: fort is situated at a distance of 20 kilometres from Atru. It is situated on a hill-top on the banks of River Parban. Shergarh from the Sur dynasty had captured this fort during Malwa Reign and the fort got its name from him. It is one of the oldest forts of India. Scriptures present in the fort suggest that the fort was ruled by Samanta Devdutta in 790 AD. He had built a monastery and a Buddhist temple in the premises of the fort as well.

Gadhgachh: It old very famous temple situated on a hill in Atru.

Khandahars of Ganeshganj are very famous.

Hathi Dilod village is famous for its statue of an elephant.

Maa Ambika Mandir situated in Musen Mata village of Tehsil Atru is well known. It is 10 kilometres from Atru.

Gugor: The fort of Gugor is a tourist spot, Which is near the tehsil Chhabra.

Education 
Atru town has a well-developed education infrastructure. The government and private schools in the town are affiliated with either Central Board of Secondary Education or Board of Secondary Education, Rajasthan and follow a 10+2 plan. The medium of instruction is either English or Hindi. The Department of Primary Education and Department of Secondary Education provide their services through primary schools, middle schools, secondary, and senior secondary schools. The Government Residential Schools, run by the Government of Rajasthan, is also running in the town to provide primary education.

There are many colleges and schools in the town, which provide higher-level education in various streams.

Colleges

 Government College, Atru
Keshav College, Atru
 Kamla Shikshan Prashikshan Sansthan, Atru
 Shree Shyam ITI, Atru
 Satya Sai ITI, Atru

Schools
 Govt. Adarsh Senior Secondary School, Station Road, Atru
 Govt. Girls Senior Secondary School, Main market, Atru
 Jawahar Navodaya Vidyalaya, NH-90, Atru
 Maharana Pratap Awasiya Vidyalaya, Atru
 Swami Vivekanand Government Model School, Kawai Road, Atru
 G.P.S. Ganesh Mohalla, Atru
 G.P.S. Kalbeliya, Atru
 G.P.S. Warehouse Area, Atru
 G.U.P.S Ratanpura, Atru
 G.U.P.S. Kherliganj, Atri
 G.U.P.Sanskrit School, Ramnagar, Atri
 G.U.P.S. NAVEEN, Atru 
 Adarsh Madhyamik Vidhya Mandir, Atru
 Sarvodaya S. S. School, Atru
 New Subhas S. S. School, Atru
 Sarswati S. S. School, Atru
 Gyan Sarovar S. S. School, Atru
 Kamla S. S. School, Atru
 Immanuel School, Atru
 Ambedkar Sen. Sec.School, Kherliganj, Atru
 Megha Public School, Gaytri Nagar, Atru

Government institutions and courts 

Panchayat Simiti
CBEO Office
SDO Office
Sessions Court

Adani Power Plant

The plant is located at village Kawai in Atru Tehsil of Baran district in the state of Rajasthan. It is located at a distance of 16 km from Atru towards 50 km south of District headquarter of Baran and 300 km from State capital, Jaipur.

Adani Power Rajasthan Limited (APRL) is the largest power producer plant in Rajasthan at a single location with a generation capacity of 1320 MW (2X660 MW). It is coal-based thermal power plant on supercritical technology.

Medical care and hospitals 
In Atru, there is a Government Hospital as well as an Ayurvedic Hospital. Which provides free of cost good treatment of every type of diseases, ailment even chronic diseases like constipation, piles, diabetes, ringworm, etc. In these hospitals there is a very good team of doctors who treat patients very friendly and carefully. Treatment for all types of diseases are available here. Even treatment of severe diseases like AIDS and T.B. are also available here. In Government Hospital Atru, 24 Emergency Care is available, There is an operation theatre, a Pathology Lab for every type of test like CBC, Malaria, blood, stool, hormones, urine, etc. All records of the hospital are maintained online on computer. There is also a Government Veterinary Hospital, where every kind of animals and pets are treated. There are so many medical stores available here for purchasing medicines.

Newspapers and news channels 
Major daily newspapers in Atru include:

 Rajasthan Patrika (Hindi)
 Dainik Bhaskar (Hindi)
 Dainik Navajyoti (Hindi)
Punjab Keshari (Hindi)
The Hindustan Times (English)

New Channels:

 News18 Rajasthan (formerly ETV Rajasthan)
Zee Rajasthan (formerly Zee Marudhara, Zee Rajasthan News)
First India News Rajasthan 
DD Rajasthan

Bank and ATMs 
All types of nationalized banks and ATMs are available here. These banks provides every type of loan for its customers like business loans, education loans, agricultural loans, home loans, etc.

 State Bank of India
 Bank of Baroda
 Central Bank of India
 IDBI Bank
 HDFC Bank
 Baran Nagrik Sahakari Bank

Vehicle Showroom 
There are many showrooms of tractors and bikes.

Bike Showroom 

 Bajaj Auto Showroom
 Hero Motocorp
 TVS Showroom

Tractor Showroom 

 Mahindra Tractors Showroom
 Swaraj Tractor Showroom
 New Holland Showroom
 John Deere Showroom
 Sonalika Showroom

Police Station 
A Police Station is situated on Salpura road. This police station is headed by an Inspector. A SHO (Station House Officer) was previously in charge. But recently it came to be known that a SI will be in charge of the station. Other than SHO the police station has additional SI, GD, writers, station guards, women desk, driver constable and other duty staff.

Local and other markets 
Atru has a small market for purchasing general items and also has a small market for purchasing vegetables in Haat Chauk and Kherliganj. There is very big market for the sale of crops like Wheat, Mustard seed, Gram (Chana), Soyabean, Coriander, Makka, Urad, Tilli seeds, and all types of grains. It is situated in front of IDBI Bank at Salpura Kawai road. Here many farmers come to sell their crops. There are many other shops for clothing, mobiles, vehicles, grocery, stationary, saloons and beauty parlours.

E-commerce and online market 
Now the e-commerce companies like Amazon and Flipkart have reached here. Their warehouse is available here. Now local residents can buy online goods through Flipkart and Amazon. The online market is developing day by day.

References

Towns in Baran District
villages in Atru Tehsil